Stephanococcus is a genus of flowering plants belonging to the family Rubiaceae.

Its native range is Western Central Tropical Africa.

Species
Species:
 Stephanococcus crepinianus (K.Schum.) Bremek.

References

Rubiaceae
Rubiaceae genera